The 2009–10 season of the 2nd Fußball-Bundesliga (women) is the sixth season of Germany's second-tier women's football league. It began on 20 September 2009 and the date set for the final relegation game is 30 May 2009. Herforder SV Borussia Friedenstal and Bayer Leverkusen achieved promotion to the Bundesliga.

Standings group north

Standings group south

Relegation play-offs 
The two 10th-placed teams of each division played a play-off. Holstein Kiel won on aggregate and stayed in the 2nd league.

References

2009-10
Ger
2
Women2